Gerry Wright is a Canadian antibiotic researcher.

Gerry Wright may also refer to:

Gerry Wright (basketball) in 1987–88 Detroit Pistons season
Gerry Wright, Edmonton city councillor, predecessor of Lance White

See also
Jerry Wright (disambiguation)
Jeremy Wright (disambiguation)
Gerald Wright (disambiguation)
Gary Wright